José Carlos dos Santos (born 17 March 1954), known as Zé Carlos, is a Brazilian former footballer who played as a forward. He competed in the men's tournament at the 1972 Summer Olympics.

References

External links
 

Living people
1954 births
Sportspeople from Recife
Brazilian footballers
Association football forwards
Brazil international footballers
Olympic footballers of Brazil
Footballers at the 1972 Summer Olympics